Anabasse was a coarse woolen material, a kind of blanketing made in France and the Netherlands for the African market, or a type of coarse blanketing made in Lancashire using a wool warp and a cotton weft.

History 
The term originally meant a type of striped loincloth manufactured in India.

See also 

 Woolen

References 

Woolen clothing
Woven fabrics